The 1973–74 Northwestern Wildcats men's basketball team represented Northwestern University during the 1973–74 NCAA Division I men's basketball season.

Schedule

References 

Northwestern Wildcats
Northwestern Wildcats men's basketball seasons
Northwestern Wild
Northwestern Wild